Emir Dilaver (born 7 May 1991) is a Bosnian-Austrian professional footballer who plays as a centre back for Prva HNL club Rijeka.

Dilaver started his professional career at Austria Wien, who loaned him to Wienerberg in 2009. In 2014, he joined Ferencváros. In 2017, he moved to Lech Poznań. The following year, he was transferred to Dinamo Zagreb.

Club career

Early career
Dilaver came through Austria Wien's youth academy. He made his professional debut playing for Wienerberg in 2009 at the age of 17.

Dilaver made his UEFA Champions League debut against Atlético Madrid on 22 October 2013.

Ferencváros
In June 2014, Dilaver moved to Hungarian team Ferencváros on a three-year contract. He made his debut for the team on 27 July against Kecskemét.

Dilaver won his first trophy with the club on 20 May 2015, by beating Fehérvár in Magyar Kupa final.

Over a year later, he scored his first goal for Ferencváros against Diósgyőr.

Lech Poznań
In June 2017, Dilaver signed a four-year deal with Polish club Lech Poznań. On 16 July, he made his official debut for the side against Sandecja. He scored his first goal for Lech Poznań against Cracovia, which turned out to be the winning goal in the game.

Dinamo Zagreb
On 29 May 2018, Dilaver was transferred to Croatian outfit Dinamo Zagreb for an undisclosed fee. He made his competitive debut for the team on 24 July in UEFA Champions League qualifier against Hapoel Be'er Sheva. A week later, he made his league debut against Istra 1961. Dilaver scored his first goal for Dinamo Zagreb in UEFA Europa League game against Viktoria Plzeň on 21 February 2019. Dilaver won his first trophy with the club on 19 April, when they were crowned league champions.

International career
Despite representing Austria at various youth levels, Dilaver decided to play for Bosnia and Herzegovina at senior level.

Career statistics

Club

Honours
Austria Wien
Austrian Bundesliga: 2012–13

Ferencváros
Nemzeti Bajnokság I: 2015–16
Magyar Kupa: 2014–15, 2015–16, 2016–17
Ligakupa: 2014–15
Szuperkupa: 2015, 2016

Dinamo Zagreb
1. HNL: 2018–19
Croatian Super Cup: 2019

References

External links

1991 births
Living people
People from Tomislavgrad
Bosnia and Herzegovina refugees
Bosnia and Herzegovina emigrants to Austria
Naturalised citizens of Austria
Austrian footballers
Austria youth international footballers
Austria under-21 international footballers
Austrian expatriate footballers
Association football central defenders
FK Austria Wien players
Ferencvárosi TC footballers
Lech Poznań players
GNK Dinamo Zagreb players
Çaykur Rizespor footballers
HNK Rijeka players
Austrian Regionalliga players
2. Liga (Austria) players
Austrian Football Bundesliga players
Nemzeti Bajnokság I players
Ekstraklasa players
Croatian Football League players
Süper Lig players
Expatriate footballers in Austria
Expatriate footballers in Hungary
Expatriate footballers in Poland
Expatriate footballers in Croatia
Expatriate footballers in Turkey
Austrian expatriate sportspeople in Hungary
Austrian expatriate sportspeople in Poland
Austrian expatriate sportspeople in Croatia
Austrian expatriate sportspeople in Turkey
Austrian people of Bosnia and Herzegovina descent
Austrian people of Turkish descent